Press may refer to:

Media
 Print media or news media, commonly called "the press"
 Printing press, commonly called "the press"
 Press (newspaper), a list of newspapers
 Press TV, an Iranian television network

People
 Press (surname), a family name of English and origin
 Press Cruthers (1890–1976), American Major League Baseball player
 Press Maravich (1915–1987), American basketball player and coach
 Press Taylor (born 1988), American football coach

Music
 The Press (band), a New York City Oi! band
 Press (album), by MU330
 "Press" (Paul McCartney song)
 "Press" (Cardi B song)

Sports and fitness
 Bench press
 Overhead press, the act of lifting a weight above the head
 Full-court press, a tactic in basketball

Other uses
 Machine press, a machine tool that changes the shape of a work-piece by the application of pressure
 "the Press", colloquial name for pressganging, a 17th- to 19th-century Royal Navy method of forced conscription
 Press (TV series), a 2018 BBC One/PBS TV series
 Press (film), a Turkish film
 Press Holdings, a UK holding company
 PRESS statistic, a statistic in regression analysis

See also
 
 Pressing (disambiguation)

Lists of people by nickname